Beamont Collegiate Academy (formerly William Beamont Community High School) is a mixed secondary school in the Orford area of Warrington, Cheshire, England. The school is named after William Beamont, a Victorian philanthropist and the first mayor of Warrington.

Previously a community school administered by Warrington Borough Council, William Beamont Community High School converted to academy status in 2013 and was renamed Beamont Collegiate Academy. The school is now sponsored by Warrington Collegiate, however the school continues to coordinate with Warrington Borough Council regarding its admissions.

The school moved into a new building in 2016, funded by the Government's Priority Schools Building Programme, on the same site and constructed by Wates Group.

Jesse Lingard, current Nottingham Forest midfielder, attended the school.

References

External links
Beamont Collegiate Academy official website

Secondary schools in Warrington
Academies in Warrington